Khmeimim Air Base (Russian: Хмеймим), also Hmeimim Air Base, is a Syrian airbase currently operated by Russia, located south-east of the city of Latakia in Hmeimim, Latakia Governorate, Syria. The airbase shares some airfield facilities with Bassel Al-Assad International Airport. The legal status of the base is regulated by a treaty Russia and Syria signed in August 2015. At the end of 2017, Russia said it had decided to turn the Khmeimim base into a component of its permanent military contingent stationed in Syria.

Name
The Russian name of the air base "" has been transliterated also in other ways, namely Hemeimeem, Hmeymin, all based on the local Arabic name, — .

History and current legal status

Khmeimim air base was built in mid-2015 adjacent to the Bassel Al-Assad International Airport to serve as "the strategic center of Russian military intervention in the Syrian Civil War". The existence of the Russian strategic base was revealed by the United States in early September and American officials expressed concern over the possibility of escalation of the conflict in Syria. The airbase became operational on 30 September 2015.

On 26 August 2015, in Damascus, Russia and Syria signed a treaty, effective forthwith, that stipulates terms and conditions of use by Russia of Syria's Khemim Airport, free of charge and with no time limit. The treaty, ratified by Russia's parliament and signed into law by president Vladimir Putin in October 2016, grants Russia's personnel and their family members jurisdictional immunity and other privileges as envisaged by Vienna Convention on Diplomatic Relations. The Syrian military is in charge of protecting the base perimeter, while the Russian side is responsible for air defense and internal policing of base personnel. The treaty was amended by signing a protocol to the treaty on 18 January 2017.

In late December 2017, Russia announced it had set about "forming a permanent grouping" at Khmeimim as well as at its naval facility in Tartus, after president Putin approved the structure and the personnel strength of the Tartus and Hmeymim bases.

Operation

Within several months in 2015 new infrastructure was built: air-conditioned accommodation for approximately 1,000 people, an air traffic control tower, runway extensions, storage facilities, field kitchens, and refuelling stations. The base is reported to be capable of handling Antonov An-124 Ruslan and Ilyushin Il-76M transport aircraft; the deployed aircraft included Sukhoi Su-24Ms, Sukhoi Su-25s, and Sukhoi Su-34s, reconnaissance aircraft Il-20M as well as T-90 tanks, BTR-82 vehicles, artillery, with Mil Mi-24, Mi-28, Ka-52 gunships and Mil Mi-8 support helicopters.

After the 24 November 2015 shootdown of a Su-24M, a S-400 defensive missile system was installed, allowing Russia to defend the air space from Southern Turkey to Northern Israel.

At the end of January 2016, Sukhoi Su-35 fighter jets started to be deployed. In February 2016, one Tupolev Tu-214R was reported to have been deployed.

At the end of February 2016 and in response to developments at the Geneva peace talks, a truce coordination center had been established at the airbase to coordinate activities of warring parties and "render maximum assistance" to all parties participating in recent ceasefire agreements; the center will not support ISIL, Al-Nusra, and terrorist groups so designated by the UN Security Council.

The Sixth Directorate of the Russian GRU reportedly operated a signals intelligence station by the airport.

In 2018 RT reported on a large-scale renovation at the airport. This included the construction of a second landing strip, hangars to shelter planes from drone attacks and the sun, and a centralized fuel system to speed up refueling. With the demise of opposing forces, Russian pilots were said to perform mainly training sessions having at hand 30 aircraft consisting of Su-35S, Su-34 and Su-24 planes and Mi-35 and Mi-8AMTSh helicopters. 

In 2021, both Tu-22M3 Backfire long-range bombers and Su-35 fighters operating from the base were reported engaged in training flights over the eastern Mediterranean.

Major incidents
In November 2016, after the Russian aircraft carrier Admiral Kuznetsov lost a MiG-29K fighter due to arrestor cable problems, satellite images indicated that at least some of the carrier's air wing of MiG-29K and Sukhoi Su-33 aircraft had been deployed to Khmeimim.

On 3 January 2018, the Kommersant reported that rebel shelling on 31 December 2017 caused the deaths of 2 Russian military personnel and the loss of at least seven aircraft stationed on the base; the Russian MoD on 4 January 2018 acknowledged that the attack occurred and confirmed that two servicemen had been killed, but denied that any jets had been disabled. According to Roman Saponkov, a Russian military journalist who posted photographs of the aftermath of the attack on the same day that the Russian MoD published its statement, no aircraft were destroyed in the attack, but ten were damaged. An article on /Drive said that key questions about the attack were still unanswered despite the Russian MoD's communique.

On 12 January 2018, the Russian MoD announced the military had eliminated the group of militants that shelled the Khmeimim airbase, close to the western border of Idlib province in a special operation. Furthermore, a terrorist drone assembly and storage depot was destroyed as well in the Syrian province of Idlib. A Krasnopol precision projectile were used in both the strikes.

On 6 March 2018, a Russian Antonov An-26 transport plane crash during an attempted landing at the airbase killed all 39 military personnel on board. The Russian MoD said that the plane was not fired upon and preliminary data suggested that a technical malfunction had caused the crash.

On September 19, 2018, a Russian Ilyushin Il-20 plane that was coming in to land was hit by Syrian air defense in a friendly fire incident. The Syrians were trying to target Israeli aircraft. The Russian Defense Ministry said that four Israeli F-16 fighter jets had attacked targets in Syria's Latakia after approaching from the Mediterranean. The Israeli warplanes had approached at a low altitude and “created a dangerous situation for other aircraft and vessels in the region.” “The Israeli pilots used the Russian plane as cover and set it up to be targeted by the Syrian air defense forces. As a consequence, the Il-20, which has radar cross-section much larger than the F-16, was shot down by an S-200 system missile,” the statement said, adding that 15 Russian military service members have died as a result.

Drone attacks
On 6 January 2018, Russian forces thwarted a drone (UAV) swarm attack on the base, the first of this kind in the history of warfare. Statements from Russia's MoD on 8 and 10 January confirmed earlier reports about the incident, saying that the attempted attack that involved 13 armed, fixed-wing drones which were used to attack both the Hmeimim base and the Tartus naval facility on 5—6 January was repulsed by the Russian forces' radio-electronic warfare technologies; it also refuted earlier reports that a greater number of UAVs were involved in the attack and alleged that the drones could have been obtained only from a country that possessed "high-tech capabilities for providing satellite navigation and remote control."

Referring to the 6 January swarm attack on 25 October, Russian Deputy Defense Minister Colonel General Alexander Fomin stated that  "Thirteen drones moved according to common combat battle deployment, operated by a single crew. During all this time the American Poseidon-8 reconnaissance plane patrolled the Mediterranean Sea area for eight hours," according to the TASS article which provided details on the operation and how the Poseidon managed the attack and the drones were switched from autonomous to manual control.  Further analysis was provided by Editor-in-Chief of National Defense journal Igor Korotchenko stating "There were three such goals: uncovering the Russian air defense system in Syria, carrying out radio-electronic reconnaissance and inflicting actual harm to our servicemen in Syria," in a 2nd TASS article providing further information on the Russian analysis of the attack and the Russian official belief that it was a Pentagon operation.  The Russian Foreign Ministry confirmed the Deputy Defence Minister's claim.  In a statement to Military Times the Pentagon said  “Any suggestion that U.S. or coalition forces played a role in an attack on a Russian base is without any basis in fact and is utterly irresponsible,” in an article covering the likelihood of the Russian claims.

On 24 April, the airbase was targeted by another wave of drones in a swarm attack. Russian forces reported they had intercepted and destroyed several "small-size unidentified airborne targets" while they approached the base.

On 30 June, Russian air defences repelled another drone attack on the base, shooting down multiple unidentified unmanned aerial vehicles. During July and August 2018, the airbase was targeted by multiple drone attacks, all were repelled. In August 2018, a total of 47 drones had been shot down by Russian air defenses. 50 drones were shot down in September–October 2018.

Three more attacks occurred in August 2019.

Air defense and electronic warfare systems deployed at Russia's Hmeymim air base in Syria have shot down or disabled over 100 drones during terrorists’ attempted attacks on the military facility over the past two years, Defense Ministry Spokesman Major-General Igor Konashenkov said on September 27, 2019.

On January 19, February 3 and 11, June 22 and July 11, 2020, and also on September 27, 2021 Russian air defense systems repelled drone attacks.

Reactions
At the end of September 2015, NATO's supreme allied commander for Europe, General Philip Breedlove, said that the kind of military infrastructure that Russia had installed in Syria, which included anti-aircraft defence systems, was a de facto no-fly zone: "As we see the very capable air defense [systems] beginning to show up in Syria, we're a little worried about another A2/AD [anti-access/area denial] bubble being created in the eastern Mediterranean." (Russia's third denial zone around Europe)

References

External links
Russian Aerospace Forces: Photo Gallery

Buildings and structures in Latakia Governorate
Latakia Governorate in the Syrian civil war
Russian Air Force bases
Islamic State of Iraq and the Levant and Russia
Russia–Syria relations
Russian military intervention in the Syrian civil war
Military installations of Russia in Syria